"Heart's Desire" is a song co-written and recorded by American country music singer Lee Roy Parnell.  It was released as the third single from his album We All Get Lucky Sometimes.  The song spent 20 weeks on the Hot Country Songs charts, peaking at number three in 1996. It was his last top 10 hit on that chart.  It was written Parnell and Cris Moore.

Chart performance
"Heart's Desire" debuted at number 64 on the U.S. Billboard Hot Country Singles & Tracks for the week of January 20, 1996.

Year-end charts

References

1996 singles
1995 songs
Lee Roy Parnell songs
Song recordings produced by Scott Hendricks
Arista Nashville singles
Songs written by Lee Roy Parnell